Black River, Nova Scotia may refer to the following communities in Nova Scotia:

Black River, Inverness County
Black River, Kings, Nova Scotia, Kings County
Black River, Pictou, Nova Scotia, Pictou County